"Damned" is the second single taken from Eva Avila's Give Me the Music album. The single reached Chum FMs 10 Most Wanted countdown numerous times and peaked at 21 on the CHUM Chart and 83 on the Canadian Hot 100.

Music video
Scenes of the music video are shown with Avila sitting on a couch in a room, looking at pictures on the wall and showing her anger at her friends boyfriend. The music video premiered on eTalk on February 25, 2009.

Chart performance

References

2009 singles
Eva Avila songs
2008 songs